Giovanni Girolamo Sbaraglia (28 October 1641 – June 1710) was an Italian physician and writer. He was a determined, perhaps obsessed, critic of the famous anatomist Marcello Malpighi.

Biography 
He was born in Bologna, and obtained a doctorate in philosophy and medicine at the University of Bologna. He gained academic positions, teaching both logic and practical medicine, and later theoretic medicine, at the university. He taught at the latter position for nearly four decades. He became a much revered clinical physician in Bologna, and was the main doctor for the Jesuit and Dominican orders in Bologna.

While he lived mainly in Bologna, his family had an estate in Crevalcore that bordered with the Malpighi property in that town. On December 14, 1659, the brother of Giovanni, Tomasso Sbaraglia, entered into an argument with the brother of Marcello Malpighi. In the course of the argument, Malpighi slayed Tomasso.

However Giovanni Sbaraglia's opposition to Malpighi was also a reactionary refusal to entertain the new methods and studies that were informing anatomy, physiology, and medicine, including the use of microscopes and the comparative study of plants and animals, specially the use of the latter in physiology studies. He published his main attack in a Latin text published pseudonymously: De recientorum medicorum studio disputato epistolarum ad amicum (Göttingen, 1684). Sbaraglia argued that animal models or the microanatomic information did little to advance practical medicine, which he stated was more properly derived from classic sources such as Galen and direct clinical experience.

The dispute with Malpighi was harsh, and Malpighi, while also holding an appointment at the University of Bologna, he faced opposition in obtaining the professorship of Anatomy at the University of Bologna. Sbaraglia continued his attacks on the Malphighian ideas in De vivipara generatione scepsis (Bologna 1696) and Oculorum et mentis vigiliae (Bologna 1704). In Bologna, others that supported Sbaraglia included Paolo Mini, Giovanni Battista Trionfetti, and Felice Marsigli. But Malpighi also had his prominent protectors including Bartolommeo Massari, professor of Medicine at the university, and  the cardinal Antonio Pignatelli, the future Pope Innocent XII. In the late 1650s, Malpighi accepted an offer to be a professor of Theoretical Medicine at the University of Pisa. Ultimately in the 18th-century, the students favored the line of study of Malpighi.

A monument to Sbaraglia is found in the Archiginnasio of the university, not far from the monument to Malpighi.

References

1641 births
1710 deaths
17th-century Italian physicians
17th-century Italian writers
People from Bologna
University of Bologna alumni
Academic staff of the University of Bologna